McKean or MacKean is a surname of Scottish and Irish origin, and may refer to:

Art
 Charles McKean, Scottish architectural historian
 Michael Jones McKean (born 1976), American artist

Military
 George Burdon McKean, Canadian recipient of the Victoria Cross
 James B. McKean (1821-1879), New York politician and Union Army general
 Scott McKean
 Thomas J. McKean (1810-1870), Union general during the American Civil War
 William McKean - American admiral

Music
 Dave McKean, illustrator, photographer, comic book artist, filmmaker and musician
 Joy McKean, Australian country music singer
 Michael McKean (born 1947), American actor, comedian, composer and musician, appeared in This Is Spinal Tap

Politics
 Arthur McKean (1882-1957), American footballer and politician
 James B. McKean (1821-1879), New York politician and Union Army general
 James J. MacKean, Irish politician in the 1928 Seanad
 Samuel McKean (1787-1841), American merchant and politician from Burlington, Pennsylvania
 Thomas McKean (1734-1817), signer of the U.S. Declaration of Independence

Sport
 Allan McKean, Australian rugby league player.
 Arthur McKean, American footballer and politician
 Bobby McKean, Scottish footballer
 Ed McKean, American baseballer
 Jim McKean (1945–2019), Canadian baseball umpire.
 Olive McKean, American swimmer
 Tom McKean, former Scottish middle distance runner who won the European Championships 800m gold medal at Split in 1990

Other fields
 Erin McKean, American lexicographer
 Henry McKean, Scottish-American mathematician
 John McKean (1941–1996), Australian ornithologist
 Kip McKean, minister
 Liz MacKean (1964–2017), British television reporter
 Roland McKean, American economist

See also
 McKeen (surname)
 McKeon

References

de:McKean
fr:McKean